Henri Matisse (1869–1954) was a French artist.

Matisse may also refer to:
 Matisse (crater), a crater on Mercury
 Matisse (Greek band), an alternative rock band from Athens, Greece
 Matisse (Mexican band), a pop group from Mexicali, Mexico
 Matisse (singer) (born 1985), American actress, model, singer and songwriter
 Jules O'Dwyer & Matisse, a dog trick act on Britain's Got Talent
 Project Matisse, a GUI design tool for NetBeans
 Matisse ITC, a typeface owned by the International Typeface Corporation
 AMD Matisse, the code name for the desktop line of AMD's Zen 2 CPUs

People with the name
Paul Matisse (born 1933), American artist and inventor, son of Pierre Matisse, grandson of Henri Matisse
Pierre Matisse (1900–1989), French-American art dealer, son of Henri Matisse
Matisse Thybulle (born 1997), American basketball player
Matilda Matisse, a character from the Japanese manga series Shaman King

See also
Daewoo Matiz
Metisse (disambiguation)